The Power of Belief was an ABC News Special aired on October 6, 1998, hosted by John Stossel. Stossel examines popular claims of therapeutic touch, psychic detectives, faith healing voodoo curses, channelling, and the media's lack of inquiry into pseudoscience.

The show included appearances from famous skeptics Michael Shermer, James Randi, and David Willey. New Age author JZ Knight, who claimed to channel a spiritual entity named "Ramtha", also appeared on the program, along with Susan Miller, John Monti, Ava Kay Jones, and Elmer Glover.

The episode contains video of the "world's longest firewalk" which included Stossel and Willey taking part.

Robert Todd Carroll called it "a very good survey of popular culture's fascination" with the paranormal. James Randi wrote "ABC-TV, in my opinion, did a really excellent job" with the show.

References

External links
 The Power of Belief (Video clip) from ABC News
 The Power of Belief from Center for Inquiry
 The Power of Belief from ABC News listing
 The Power of Belief Transcript from ABC News (archive.org)
 The Power of Belief (Unofficial transcript)
 The Teaching of Courses in the Science and Pseudoscience of Psychology: Useful Resources

ABC News
American Broadcasting Company original programming
Scientific skepticism mass media
1990s American television specials
1998 American television series debuts
1998 American television series endings
1998 television specials